Moses Gage Leonard (July 10, 1809 – March 20, 1899) was an American politician who served one term as a U.S. Representative from New York from 1843 to 1845.

Biography 
Born in Stafford, Connecticut, Leonard grew up in Union and attended the public schools.
He moved to New York City.
City alderman and judge of the city court 1840-1842.

Congress 
Leonard was elected as a Democrat to the Twenty-eighth Congress (March 4, 1843 – March 4, 1845).
He was an unsuccessful candidate for reelection in 1844 to the Twenty-ninth Congress.
Almshouse commissioner in 1846.

Later career and death 
He served as proprietor and director of ice companies.
He served as commissioner of immigration at the port of New York.

He moved to San Francisco, California.
He served as a member of the city council of San Francisco in 1850.
He returned to New York and served as provost marshal in the Tenth Congressional District of New York during the Civil War.

He died in Brooklyn, New York, on March 20, 1899.
He was interred in Oak Hill Cemetery, Nyack, New York.

References 

1809 births
1899 deaths
Democratic Party members of the United States House of Representatives from New York (state)
California Democrats
Politicians from San Francisco
New York City Council members
19th-century American politicians
People from Stafford, Connecticut
People from Union, Connecticut
Members of the United States House of Representatives from New York (state)